Yomi Hirasaka (平坂読, Hirasaka Yomi) is a Japanese novelist, game scenario writer, songwriter and manga writer. They are from the Gifu Prefecture. His pseudonym is derived from Yomotsu Hirasaka.

Career 
Upon winning the first MF Bunko J Light Novel Rookie Award of Excellence in 2004, they debuted with their novel Haunted! (ホーンテッド!).

In an interview in the 2011 edition of Kono Light Novel ga Sugoi!, Hirasaka announced their series Maō kara wa Nigerarenai (魔王からは逃げられない) would be published by GA Bunko. As of 2021 however, this has yet to be realized.

His series have been popular, with Ranobe-bu (ラノベ部) scoring 1st in the Kono Light Novel poll in 2010 and Haganai (僕は友達が少ない) scoring 2nd in the same poll the following year. Haganai also became the best-selling light novel in 2011, the same year it was adapted to anime.

March 2015 saw the release of A Sister's All You Need (妹さえいればいい) under the Gagaga Bunko label, which later was adapted to an anime in 2017.

Works

Light novels 

Haunted! (ホーンテッド!) (Illustrated by Yū Katase, published by MF Bunko J, 4 volumes, 2004 - 2005)
Sora ni Usagi ga Noboru Koro (ソラにウサギがのぼるころ) (Illustrated by Hiromu Minato, published by MF Bunko J, 4 volumes, 2006)
Nekuroma (ねくろま。) (Illustrated by Jirō, published by MF Bunko J, 6 volumes, 2007 - 2008)
Nekuroma Infinity (ねくろま。∞（インフィニティ）) (Illustrated by Jirō, published by MF Bunko J, April 2009, ISBN 9784840118736)
Ranobe-bu (ラノベ部) (Illustrated by Yōta, published by MF Bunko J, 3 volumes, 2008 - 2009)
Maria Holic Anthology (まりあ†ほりっくアンソロジー) (Original story by Minari Endō, published by MF Bunko J, March 2009, ISBN 9784840127165)
Haganai (僕は友達が少ない) (Illustrated by Buriki, published by MF Bunko J, 11 volumes, 2009 - 2015)
Boku wa Tomodachi ga Sukunai CONNECT (僕は友達が少ないCONNECT) (Illustrated by Buriki, published by MF Bunko J, December 2012, ISBN 9784840143653)
A Sister's All You Need (妹さえいればいい。) (Illustrated by Kantoku, published by Gagaga Bunko, 14 volumes, 2015 - 2020)
Shimekiri Mae Niwa Yuri ga Hakadoru (〆切前には百合が捗る) (Illustrated by U35, published by GA Bunko, December 2020, ISBN 9784815608088)
Salad Bowl of Eccentrics (変人のサラダボウル) (Illustrated by Kantoku, published by Gagaga Bunko, 2 volumes since October 2021)

Manga 

Sekigan no Shōnen Occult Maiden ~Kageshō~ (隻眼ノ少年 オカルトメイデン〜影章〜) (Illustrated by Chado, published in Young Gangan, 2 volumes, 2014)
Occult Maiden Yōshō Oni o tsugu Shōnen (オカルトメイデン 陽章 鬼を継ぐ少年) (Illustrated by Hiroichi, published in Monthly Comic Alive, 1 volume, 2013 - 2015)

Game scenarios 

Occult Maiden (オカルトメイデン) (Developed by Square Enix, November 2013)
Chain Chronicle (チェインクロニクル) (Developed by Sega)
Media Factory Collaboration Scenario (2014)
Kadokawa Collaboration Scenario (2016)

Tabletop RPG performance 

Grancrest Replay Live Series Live Factory (グランクレスト・リプレイ ライブシリーズ ライブ・ファクトリー) (Authored by Shunsaku Yano, published by Fujimi Dragon Book, 2014)

Music 

 2011年

 FLOWER (Lyrics)

 2013年

 Be My Friend (Lyrics)
 僕らの翼 (Lyrics)
 ブレス (Lyrics)
 FANTASISTA (Lyrics)
 君と僕 (Lyrics)

Anime 

Haganai Season 2 (Series composition)
A Sister's All You Need (Series composition, screenwriting)

References

External links 
 

Living people
People from Gifu Prefecture
Manga writers
Japanese lyricists
Japanese novelists
Light novelists
Year of birth missing (living people)